Tavares Bolden (born June 8, 1979) is an American former professional Canadian football quarterback who played in the Canadian Football League (CFL).

Early life and high school
Bolden was born and grew up in Cleveland, Ohio and attended Glenville High School. He did not join the school's football team until his junior year and became the Tarblooders' starting quarterback, passing for 2,800 yards and 31 touchdowns in two seasons.

College career
Bolden was a member of the Toledo Rockets for five seasons, redshirting as a freshman. He became the team's starting quarterback midway through his sophomore year, becoming the first player from a Cleveland Public School to become an FBS starting quarterback since Benny Friedman in 1926. As a junior, Bolden passed for 1,597 yards with 13 touchdown passes and four interceptions while rushing for 464 yards and five touchdowns and was named first team All-Mid-American Conference (MAC). In his senior season he was named second team All-MAC after completing 214-of-319 pass attempts for a then-MAC record 67.1% completion percentage and 2,466 yards with 13 touchdowns and also rushed for 335 yards and four touchdowns. He finished his collegiate career with 5,282 passing yards and 34 touchdown passes and 1,065 rushing yards and nine touchdowns. Bolden was inducted into Toledo's Varsity ‘T’ Hall of Fame in 2015.

Professional career
Bolden was signed by the Montreal Alouettes of the Canadian Football League (CFL) on April 24, 2002. Bolden played three seasons with Montreal as a backup quarterback.

References

External links
Toledo Rockets Hall of Fame bio

1979 births
Living people
Canadian football quarterbacks
American football quarterbacks
Toledo Rockets football players
Players of American football from Cleveland
Montreal Alouettes players
Players of Canadian football from Cleveland